Tefo Maipato (born 9 March 1986) is a Mosotho retired footballer who is last known to have played as a midfielder for Bantu.

Career

At the age of 16, Maipato joined the youth academy of South African top flight side Orlando Pirates, where he said, ¨When I came home it was because I was tired of waiting for something that wasn’t there... (The) coaches there had said that by 2006 I would be promoted to the first team but I don’t know what happened. It was painful to see players that I played with get promoted while I was stuck in the reserves.¨ In 2009, he signed for Bantu in Lesotho.

References

External links
 

Lesotho footballers
Living people
Expatriate soccer players in South Africa
1986 births
Association football midfielders
Lesotho international footballers